The fourth series of the British drama series Merlin began on 1 October 2011 with the episode "The Darkest Hour - Part 1". It consists of 13 episodes originally shown on Saturday evenings on BBC One and BBC One HD (repeats shown on BBC Three). The series producer was Sara Hamill, and executive producers were Johnny Capps and Julian Murphy. The directors of the series include Alice Troughton, Alex Pillai, Justin Molotnikov and Jeremy Webb. Writers include Julian Jones (head writer), Howard Overman, Jake Michie, Lucy Watkins, and Richard McBrien.

Series four stars the regular cast from the previous series including Colin Morgan, Angel Coulby, Bradley James, Katie McGrath, and Richard Wilson. Credited as a regular, Anthony Head left the series after his character was killed off in "The Wicked Day". Nathaniel Parker joined the regular cast in this series (credited as such for the first time in "Aithusa") and John Hurt returned as the voice of the Great Dragon. Supporting cast members include Adetomiwa Edun, Eoin Macken, Tom Hopper, and Rupert Young.

Notable guest actors include Santiago Cabrera, Emilia Fox, Gemma Jones, Phil Davis, James Callis, Lindsay Duncan, Gary Lewis, Charlene McKenna, Janet Montgomery, Terence Maynard, Ben Daniels, Miranda Raison and Caroline Faber.

Plot 
A year has passed since Morgana betrayed Uther, who has been left heartbroken. Prince Arthur takes charge and later becomes king after his father's death. Agravaine, Arthur's uncle, becomes Arthur's trusted advisor.

With Morgana's powers growing rapidly outside Camelot, Merlin must be more cautious and vigilant to protect Arthur and prevent Camelot's destruction. Merlin, Guinevere, and Gaius assist Arthur as Camelot enters difficult times. It becomes quickly apparent to everyone but Arthur that Agrivaine is in league with Morgana and wants her to ascend the throne.

In the two-part finale of the series, Morgana and Agrivaine attack Camelot. Morgana takes the throne. Merlin enchants Arthur, who is angry and feels that he has not behaved like a king, to get him to leave Camelot. Agrivaine pursues him, but Merlin reveals who he is and kills him. Merlin restores Arthur's faith in himself when he arranges for Arthur to pull Excalibur out of a stone. The night before the attack, Merlin secretly enters Camelot and places an enchanted stick figure under Morgana's bed that drains her of her powers. The attack is successful, Morgana disappears, and Arthur marries Guinevere.

Cast 

The full list of cast members is as follows:

Main cast 
 Colin Morgan as Merlin
 Angel Coulby as Gwen
 Bradley James as Arthur
 Katie McGrath as Morgana
 Anthony Head as Uther Pendragon
 Nathaniel Parker as Lord Agravaine
 Richard Wilson as Gaius

Recurring 
 John Hurt as the Great Dragon (voice)
 Santiago Cabrera as Sir Lancelot
 Rupert Young as Sir Leon
 Eoin Macken as Sir Gwaine
 Adetomiwa Edun as Sir Elyan
 Tom Hopper as Sir Percival
 Michael Cronin as Geoffrey of Monmouth
 Terence Maynard as Helios

Guest stars 

 Emilia Fox as Morgause
 Gemma Jones as The Cailleach
 Phil Davis as The Gleeman
 James Callis as Julius Borden
 Charlene McKenna as Lamia
 Janet Montgomery as Princess Mithian
 Lindsay Duncan as Queen Annis
 Steven Hartley as King Caerleon
 Zee Asha as Audrey
 Sarah Beck Mather as Vilia
 Gary Lewis as Alator of the Catha
 Miranda Raison as Isolde
 Ben Daniels as Tristan
 Caroline Faber as Hunith

Episodes

Production 
The production of a fourth series of Merlin was confirmed on 25 October 2010. Anthony Head confirmed that the show will air in September 2011. Series 4 will consist of 13 episodes. Colin Morgan said episodes would no longer be as stand-alone, "Each episode takes a progression as a piece of a jigsaw that has to be completed. There's no reverse going on." Due to the popularity of the show, Merlin was renewed for a fifth series.

Casting 
Three days before the series finale Julian Jones the series creator stated that Colin Morgan, Bradley James, Katie McGrath, Angel Coulby, Anthony Head, and Richard Wilson are all contracted for multiple season and they would return as series regulars. John Hurt who narrated the show and plays the voice of the great dragon would also be upgraded back into a series regular after having a recurring role in season two. On 19 August 2011 Phil Davis was cast as the Gleeman. Nathaniel Parker and Charlene McKenna would also join the casting playing Agravaine and Lamia. James Callis joined that casting for the fourth episode as Julius Borden. Gemma Jones will play Cailleach the gatekeeper to the spirit world. Lindsay Duncan will appear in one episode playing the Queen of Annis. Steven Hartley also joined the casting as King Caerleon. Rupert Young will also return. Tom Hopper and Adetomiwa Edun confirmed that they will also return on their roles.

References

2011 British television seasons
Merlin (2008 TV series)